160 (one hundred [and] sixty) is the natural number following 159 and preceding 161.

In mathematics
160 is the sum of the first 11 primes, as well as the sum of the cubes of the first three primes.

Given 160, the Mertens function returns 0. 160 is the smallest number n with exactly 12 solutions to the equation φ(x) = n.

In telecommunications
 The number of characters permitted in a standard short message service
 The number for Dial-a-Disc (1966–1991), a telephone number operated by the General Post Office in the United Kingdom, which enabled callers to hear the latest chart hits

See also
 160s
 List of highways numbered 160
 United Nations Security Council Resolution 160
 United States Supreme Court cases, Volume 160
 Article 160 of the Constitution of Malaysia
 Norris School District 160, Lancaster County, Nebraska

References

External links

 Number Facts and Trivia: 160

Integers